Patrick Shanahan (November 6, 1867 – December 7, 1937) was a United States Navy sailor who received the Medal of Honor. He was presented the medal on 7 April 1901 while serving on the USS Essex. (Logbook 46 of USS Essex, NA, Washington DC)

Biography
Shanahan was born in Ireland, emigrated to the United States and enlisted in the U.S. Navy 1892.  

In 1899 he was a chief boatswain's mate on the USS Alliance when he rescued another sailor from drowning.  For this action, he was awarded the Medal of Honor.

He was warranted to boatswain on March 11, 1902, and promoted to chief boatswain on March 11, 1908.  During World War I, he received a temporary promotion to lieutenant on July 1, 1918.

He retired from the Navy in 1922 and died in 1937.  He is buried in Arlington National Cemetery.

Medal of Honor citation
Rank and organization: Chief Boatswain's Mate, U.S. Navy. Born: November 6, 1867, Ireland. Accredited to: New York. G.O. No.: 534, November 29, 1899.

Citation:

On board the U.S.S. Alliance, 28 May 1899. Displaying heroism, Shanahan rescued William Steven, quartermaster, first class, from drowning.

See also

List of Medal of Honor recipients during peacetime

External links
Arlington National Cemetery

1867 births
1937 deaths
19th-century Irish people
Irish sailors in the United States Navy
Irish emigrants to the United States (before 1923)
Military personnel from New York (state)
United States Navy sailors
United States Navy Medal of Honor recipients
Irish-born Medal of Honor recipients
Burials at Arlington National Cemetery
Non-combat recipients of the Medal of Honor
Irish military personnel